"Somebody's Always Saying Goodbye" is a song written by Bob McDill, and recorded by Canadian country music artist Anne Murray.  It was released in November 1982 as the second single from her album The Hottest Night of the Year.

The single reached #7 on Billboard's Country chart and peaked at #36 Adult Contemporary.  It also hit #1 on the Canadian RPM Adult Contemporary Tracks chart in early 1983.

The song also appears on Murray's 2007 album Anne Murray Duets: Friends & Legends, performed as a duet with Jann Arden.

Chart performance

References

Songs about parting
1982 singles
1982 songs
Anne Murray songs
Capitol Records singles
Songs written by Bob McDill
Song recordings produced by Jim Ed Norman